Regge may refer to

 Tullio Regge (1931-2014), Italian physicist, developer of Regge calculus and Regge theory
 Regge calculus, formalism for producing simplicial approximations of spacetimes
 Regge theory, study of the analytic properties of scattering
 3778 Regge, main-belt asteroid
 Regge (river), river in Overijssel, the Netherlands

Surnames of Italian origin